Hymenopus coronatus is a mantis from the tropical forests of Southeast Asia. It is known by various common names including walking flower mantis and (pink) orchid mantis. It is one of several species known as flower mantises from their resemblance and behaviour. They are known to grab their prey with blinding speed.

Description
This species mimics parts of the orchid flower. The four walking legs resemble flower petals, and the toothed front pair is used as in other mantises for grasping prey.

H. coronatus shows some of the most pronounced size sexual dimorphism of any species of mantis; males can be less than half the size of females. The female predatory selection is the likely driving force behind the development of the extreme sexual size dimorphism. Prior to development of its camouflage, the female mantis implements ambush predation to allow it to hunt larger pollinating insects. An example of this ambush predation is the orchid mantis's ability to ambush foraging butterflies, a fairly large prey, which it captures using its pair of toothed arms and powerful bite. As the female orchid continues to develop, much of its dramatic increase in size can be attributed to predatory selection and ambush predation.

First-stage nymphs mimic bugs of the family Reduviidae, which have a powerful bite and are foul-tasting.

The mantis can change its colour between pink and brown, according to the colour of the background.

Distribution

H. coronatus is found in the rain forests of Southeast Asia, including Malaysia, Myanmar, Thailand, Philippines, and Indonesia. It is also found in the Western Ghats of India.

Behaviour

Hugh Cott quotes an account by Nelson Annandale of Hymenopus coronatus which he reports hunts on the flowers of the "Straits Rhododendron", Melastoma polyanthum. The nymph has what Cott calls "Special Alluring Coloration", where the animal itself is the "decoy". The insect is pink and white, with flattened limbs with "that semi-opalescent, semi-crystalline appearance that is caused in flower-petals by a purely structural arrangement of liquid globules or empty cells". The mantis climbs up and down the twigs of the plant until it finds one that has flowers. It holds on to these with the claws of its two rearmost pairs of legs. It then sways from side to side, and soon various small flies land on and around it, attracted by the small black spot on the end of its abdomen which resembles a fly. When a larger Dipteran fly, as big as a house fly, landed nearby, the mantis at once seized and ate it.

Mimicry has been widely discussed since the 1861 description by Henry Walter Bate. While the orchid mantis is successful at catching its prey through its color mimicry alone, recent research shows that orchid mantises attract an increased number of natural pollinators when compared to other flowers. Labeling these mantises as 'aggressive mimics' with their ability to turn pollinators into prey.  In a concurrent study, the spectral reflection of orchid mantises were measured using a spectrometer to determine how their colour may be perceived by other animals. Adult and juvenile orchid mantises primarily reflected UV-absorbing white and based on visual modelling their colour is indistinguishable from co-occurring flowers from the perspective of pollinating insects.

The species is reported by Costa, quoting Shelford's 1903 account, to show parental care by guarding the eggs. Costa asks rhetorically "Why has so little [research] been done on parental care in mantids, such an unexpected and intriguing aspect of their behavior?"

The camouflage of the orchid mantis probably deceives potential predators, as well as serving as aggressive mimicry of the orchid to help catch insect prey.

Diet

The species is carnivorous, mainly catching other insects. In the laboratory, it prefers lepidopteran prey.
Its diet consists of small insects, including crickets, flies, fruit flies, beetles, and stinging insects such as bees. Some are cannibalistic, eating their own siblings when one strays too close. Mantises should also not be fed any prey larger than their abdomen as it could cause their abdomen to rupture, ultimately leading to death.

In human culture

History

Alfred Russel Wallace in his 1889 book Darwinism, calls the mantis rare:

The drawing was published in Edward Bagnall Poulton's book The Colours of Animals. Poulton calls it an "Indian Mantis" which "feeds upon other insects, which it attracts by its flower-like shape and pink colour. The apparent petals are the flattened legs of the insect."

Breeding
The orchid mantis is favoured by insect breeders, but is extremely rare, so is also extremely expensive. Breeding the mantises is a time-consuming process as the larger female will try to eat the smaller male once the mating is done.  Therefore, the breeder will need to watch the couple throughout the entire process.

Additional images

See also 
 List of mantis genera and species
 Flower mantis

References

Bibliography 
 
 
 
 
 O’Hanlon, James C.; Holwell, Gregory I.; Herberstein, Marie E. (2014-01-01). "Pollinator Deception in the Orchid Mantis". The American Naturalist. 183 (1): 126–132. doi:10.1086/673858. ISSN 0003-0147.Svenson, Gavin J.; Brannoch,
 Research on how orchid mantises catch and attract their prey.  Use information about orchid mantis behavior.
 Sydney K.; Rodrigues, Henrique M.; O’Hanlon, James C.; Wieland, Frank (2016-12-01). "Selection for predation, not female fecundity, explains sexual size dimorphism in the orchid mantises". Scientific Reports. 6 (1): 37753. doi:10.1038/srep37753. ISSN 2045-2322.
 Explains the differences in behavior, description, and reproduction in female orchid mantises versus males.
 O'hanlon, J. C.; Li, D.; Norma-Rashid, Y. (2013-07). "Coloration and Morphology of the Orchid Mantis Hymenopus coronatus (Mantodea: Hymenopodidae)". Journal of Orthoptera Research. 22 (1): 35–44
 Describes the color and morphology of orchid mantises, as well as their ability of mimicry.

Hymenopodidae
Mantodea of Southeast Asia
Insects of Indonesia
Insects of Laos
Insects of Malaysia
Insects of Thailand
Insects of Vietnam
Insects of Myanmar
Insects of Cambodia
Insects of Singapore
Insects described in 1792